Ben Moor may refer to:
 
Ben Moor (writer) (born 1969), English writer
Ben Moor (American football) ( 1970s), American football coach

See also
Ben Moore (disambiguation)
Ben More (disambiguation)
Benjamin Moore (disambiguation)
Moor (disambiguation)